Mike Lerner is a documentary film maker.

On January 24, 2012, he was nominated for an Academy Award for the film Hell and Back Again.

Filmography
 Machine of Human Dreams (documentary) (producer) 2016
 Pussy Riot: A Punk Prayer (documentary) (director) 2013
A Whole Lott More (documentary) (producer) 2012
The Negotiators (producer) 2012 
Hell and Back Again (documentary) (producer) 2011
A Bipolar Expedition (TV documentary) (producer) 2010 
Afghan Star (documentary) (executive producer) 2009
America the Wright Way (TV series) (executive producer) 2008 
Sickert vs Sargent (TV documentary) (producer) 2007
Toulouse-Lautrec: The Full Story (TV documentary) (producer) 2006
Kazakhstan Swings (TV documentary) (producer) 2006
Vincent: The Full Story (TV series documentary) (producer) 2004
Beijing Swings (TV documentary) (producer)2003 
Gauguin: The Full Story (TV documentary) (producer)2003 
Picasso: Magic, Sex & Death (TV mini-series documentary) (producer)2001 
Without Walls (TV series documentary) (producer; 2 episodes) 1995-1996

References

External links

Living people
American documentary filmmakers
Year of birth missing (living people)